Eutreta rotundipennis is a species of fruit fly in the family Tephritidae.

Distribution
United States.

References

Tephritinae
Insects described in 1862
Diptera of North America